Rumoshtik (also Romanized as Rūmoshtīk and Rūmashtīk; also known as Rūmoshnītak and Rumashti) is a village in Paskuh Rural District, Sedeh District, Qaen County, South Khorasan Province, Iran. At the 2006 census, its population was 300, in 71 families.

References 

Populated places in Qaen County